Ignazio Oliva (17th century) was an Italian painter of the Baroque period, active near his natal city of Orta di Atella. He was a pupil of Domenico Gargiulo. He is known for painting outdoor vedute: seascapes and landscapes.

References

17th-century Neapolitan people
Painters from Naples
Italian Baroque painters
Italian landscape painters
Year of death unknown
Year of birth unknown